Wyrmwood (also known as Wyrmwood: Road of the Dead) is a 2014 Australian action-horror film directed by Kiah Roache-Turner and starring Jay Gallagher, Bianca Bradey, Leon Burchill, Keith Agius, Berynn Schwerdt and Luke McKenzie. The screenplay concerns a mechanic who finds himself faced with zombie hordes. Roache-Turner's directorial debut, it had its world premiere on 19 September 2014 at Fantastic Fest.

Plot
Mechanic Barry lives in the Australian outback with his wife Annie and daughter Meganne. During a meteor shower, Barry's sister Brooke is attacked in her Bulla, Victoria studio by her model and her assistant, who have suddenly become zombies. She calls Barry and warns him to get out of the city. He, Annie, and Meganne don gas masks and fight their way to the family car. When Meganne and Annie remove their gas masks they become infected and zombify, and Barry is forced to kill them with a nailgun. He runs out of nails before he can kill himself.

Chalker, another survivor, finds Barry and knocks him unconscious when Barry attempts to kill himself with Chalker's gun. Barry asks Chalker to take him to Brooke's studio, unaware that a paramilitary group has taken her captive in the back of a truck that serves as a mobile lab for mad scientist Doc. While Doc experiments on the zombies and Brooke, Chalker's truck stops working. Chalker and Barry continue on foot, and Benny, another survivor, mistakenly kills Chalker. Benny, who previously had to kill his infected brother, and Barry team up and come upon a garage staffed by Frank and his assistant. Frank explains that all flammable liquids have become useless. However, the group accidentally discovers zombie breath and blood are flammable, and they devise a zombie-powered engine. During their escape, Frank's assistant becomes infected and is used as fuel.

Barry, Benny, and Frank discover zombies stop breathing flammable gas at night, enabling them to run faster. As they hole up in the truck overnight, Frank says he believes the zombies resulted from the meteor shower; as told in the Bible, a star called Wyrmwood has fallen, making part of the world bitter. After waking up from a nightmare, Barry catches a zombie on fire and accidentally sets the truck's compressor alight. While putting out the fire, Frank is bitten and asks Barry to shoot him; Barry does. The next day, Barry and Benny encounter paramilitaries in an electric-powered truck. The two drivers, after revealing that those with an A negative blood type are not affected by the disease, offer to lead Barry and Benny to Brooke, who they claim is in custody nearby. Meanwhile, Brooke learns she can now telepathically control zombies as a result of the experiments. With the help of several zombies, she kills Doc, escapes the truck, and joins Barry and Benny.

Barry's truck stalls after the soldiers accidentally kill the zombie powering it. While taking a pit stop for Brooke to fetch them a zombie, Benny is shot in the stomach. When they later pull over to take care of Benny, the soldiers catch up and subdue them. The soldiers reveal their plan is to decapitate Brooke and take her head to their commanding officer. Barry plans to kill them all in an explosion, but Benny instead sacrifices himself to turn into a zombie so Brooke can control him to overpower the soldiers. He kills two of the three soldiers, but the captain kills him and shoots Brooke in the chest. Barry challenges him to a fistfight but ends up shot when the captain retrieves his pistol. After shooting a zombie, the captain's face is splattered with zombie blood, and Barry ignites his head with the matches. Before Barry can shoot him, Brooke rises and commands a horde of zombies to eat the captain alive.

Barry and Brooke, back on the road, come across the lab truck again. They ask the soldiers what they have in the back of the truck; when they refuse to answer, Brooke commands a new group of zombies to attack them and tear them apart.

Cast
Jay Gallagher as Barry
Bianca Bradey as Brooke
Leon Burchill as Benny
Luke McKenzie as The Captain
Yure Covich as Chalker
Catherine Terracini as Annie
Keith Agius as Frank
Meganne West as Meganne
Berynn Schwerdt as The Doctor
Cain Thompson as McGaughlin
Beth Aubrey as Charlotte
Sheridan Harbridge as Sherri
Damian Dyke as Thompson

Release
The film premiered as Wyrmwood: Road of the Dead on 19 September 2014 as part of the Fantastic Fest. The limited theatre release was on 12 February 2015, It was originally supposed to have a one night only theatrical release in Australia, opening on 74 screens, but an overwhelming response and sold out sessions across the country saw its run being extended for weeks in some cinemas. It was followed by a Video on Demand release, over IFC Midnight on 13 February 2015.

Reception

The film review website Metacritic surveyed  and assessed 5 reviews as positive, 3 as mixed, and 1 as negative. It gave an weighed average score of 54 out of 100, which it said indicated "mixed or average reviews". The similar website Rotten Tomatoes surveyed  and, categorizing the reviews as positive or negative, assessed 31 as positive and 37as negative. It gave the film a score of 82% and summarized the critical consensus, "Rough around the edges but inspired at its core, Wyrmwood is a giddy variation on the zombie genre that will sate gore hounds' appetite for mayhem."

Twitch Film and The Hollywood Reporter both praised the film, and Twitch Film commented that the film's script is original. Variety also commented upon this element, as they enjoyed the character of Brooke "being injected with a chemical concoction that somehow gives her the ability to control the hungry hordes" and that "other nifty little touches, such as Frank and Barry’s discovery that zombie blood can be used as a substitute for gasoline, Brooke’s psychic powers bring something fresh to a horror subgenre that’s received a particularly heavy flogging in recent years." Shock Till You Drop also gave a favorable review, stating that they found it to be an "impressive feature debut". IGN awarded it 7.5 out of 10, saying "Wyrmwood may tread familiar ground, but it's still a bloody good time."

Wyrmwood was reviewed in The West Australian: "with clear inspirations in Dawn of the Dead, The Evil Dead, Bad Taste, Re-Animator and ... Mad Max, from its Gothic-looking helmets, masks and weapons to its retro-fitted vehicles, Wyrmwood looks and plays a lot better than its $160,000 budget suggests."

Sequel
In February 2015, a plan for a sequel was announced, with a potential return of the original actors Jay Gallagher, Bianca Bradey, Leon Burchill, Luke McKenzie, and Yure Covich. The release was proposed for early 2017, after the  release of a “mental ghost" film,  from Kiah & Tristan Roache-Turner.

The Roache-Turner brothers later announced that, due to the positive response to the film, their next project would in fact be the Wyrmwood sequel, in the form of a 10-episode TV series titled Wyrmwood: Chronicles of the Dead. The team released a short teaser for the series on 19 May 2017, featuring Gallagher and Bradey reprising their roles as Barry and Brooke. The brothers are also working on a sci-fi horror film, Nekromancer, as they develop the series.

In August 2020, funding was announced for a sequel titled Wyrmwood Apocalypse. Set in a post-apocalyptic world, this film follows soldier Rhys on an arc of redemption as he turns against his evil bosses to join forces with a group of rebel survivors. Together they help save a little girl’s sister from death at the hands of the military.

The sequel Wyrmwood: Apocalypse was released in 2021.

References

External links
 
 
 IndieGoGo campaign (now ended)

2014 films
2014 horror films
Australian zombie films
Australian action adventure films
Australian comedy horror films
2014 directorial debut films
Films about viral outbreaks
2010s exploitation films
Australian action horror films
Australian science fiction horror films
Australian science fiction action films
Australian post-apocalyptic films
Australian splatter films
2010s English-language films